Șimian is a commune located in Mehedinți County, Oltenia, Romania. It is composed of eight villages: Cerneți, Dedovița Nouă, Dedovița Veche, Dudașu, Erghevița, Poroina, Șimian, and Valea Copcii.

Natives
Dimitrie Grecescu (1841–1910), botanist and physician
Constantin Oțet (1940–1999), football coach
Alexandru Săvulescu (1847–1902), architect
Sorin Vlaicu (b. 1965), football player

See also
Șimian (island)

References

Communes in Mehedinți County
Localities in Oltenia